Propanediol may refer to any of four isomeric organic chemical compounds:

Non-geminal diols (glycols)
1,2-Propanediol, a.k.a. propylene glycol, a vicinal diol
1,3-Propanediol, a.k.a. trimethylene glycol

Geminal diols

1,1-Propanediol
2,2-Propanediol